An ideology is a set of beliefs or philosophies attributed to a person or group of persons, especially those held for reasons that are not purely epistemic, in which "practical elements are as prominent as theoretical ones." Formerly applied primarily to economic, political, or religious theories and policies, in a tradition going back to Karl Marx and Friedrich Engels, more recent use the term as mainly condemnatory.

The term was coined by Antoine Destutt de Tracy, a French Enlightenment aristocrat and philosopher, who conceived it in 1796 as the "science of ideas" to develop a rational system of ideas to oppose the irrational impulses of the mob. In political science, the term is used in a descriptive sense to refer to political belief systems.

Etymology and history

The term ideology originates from French idéologie, itself deriving from combining  (close to the Lockean sense of idea) and -logíā.

The term ideology, and the system of ideas associated with it, was coined in 1796 by Antoine Destutt de Tracy while in prison pending trial during the Reign of Terror, where he read the works of Locke and Condillac. Hoping to form a secure foundation for the moral and political sciences, Tracy devised the term for a "science of ideas," basing such upon two things:

 the sensations that people experience as they interact with the material world; and
 the ideas that form in their minds due to those sensations.

He conceived ideology as a liberal philosophy that would defend individual liberty, property, free markets, and constitutional limits on state power. He argues that, among these aspects, ideology is the most generic term because the 'science of ideas' also contains the study of their expression and deduction. The coup that overthrew Maximilien Robespierre allowed Tracy to pursue his work. Tracy reacted to the terroristic phase of the revolution (during the Napoleonic regime) by trying to work out a rational system of ideas to oppose the irrational mob impulses that had nearly destroyed him.

A subsequent early source for the near-original meaning of ideology is Hippolyte Taine's work on the Ancien Régime, Origins of Contemporary France I. He describes ideology as rather like teaching philosophy via the Socratic method, though without extending the vocabulary beyond what the general reader already possessed, and without the examples from observation that practical science would require. Taine identifies it not just with Destutt De Tracy, but also with his milieu, and includes Condillac as one of its precursors.

Napoleon Bonaparte came to view ideology as a term of abuse, which he often hurled against his liberal foes in Tracy's Institutional. According to Karl Mannheim's historical reconstruction of the shifts in the meaning of ideology, the modern meaning of the word was born when Napoleon used it to describe his opponents as "the ideologues." Tracy's major book, The Elements of Ideology, was soon translated into the major languages of Europe.

In the century following Tracy, the term ideology moved back and forth between positive and negative connotations. During this next generation, when post-Napoleonic governments adopted a reactionary stance, influenced the Italian, Spanish and Russian thinkers who had begun to describe themselves as "liberals" and who attempted to reignite revolutionary activity in the early 1820s, including the Carlist rebels in Spain; the Carbonari societies in France and Italy; and the Decembrists in Russia.

The term has since dropped some of its pejorative sting, and has become a neutral term in the analysis of differing political opinions and views of social groups. While Marx situated the term within class struggle and domination, others believed it was a necessary part of institutional functioning and social integration.

Definitions and analysis
There are many different kinds of ideologies, including political, social, epistemological, and ethical.

Recent analysis tends to posit that ideology is a 'coherent system of ideas' that rely on a few basic assumptions about reality that may or may not have any factual basis. Through this system, ideas become coherent, repeated patterns through the subjective ongoing choices that people make. These ideas serve as the seed around which further thought grows. The belief in an ideology can range from passive acceptance up to fervent advocacy. According to most recent analysis, ideologies are neither necessarily right nor wrong.

Definitions, such as by Manfred Steger and Paul James emphasize both the issue of patterning and contingent claims to truth:

Studies of the concept of ideology itself (rather than specific ideologies) have been carried out under the name of systematic ideology in the works of George Walford and Harold Walsby, who attempt to explore the relationships between ideology and social systems.

David W. Minar describes six different ways the word ideology has been used:
 As a collection of certain ideas with certain kinds of content, usually normative;
 As the form or internal logical structure that ideas have within a set;
 By the role ideas play in human-social interaction;
 By the role ideas play in the structure of an organization;
 As meaning, whose purpose is persuasion; and
 As the locus of social interaction.

For Willard A. Mullins, an ideology should be contrasted with the related (but different) issues of utopia and historical myth. An ideology is composed of four basic characteristics:
 it must have power over cognition;
 it must be capable of guiding one's evaluations;
 it must provide guidance towards action; and
 it must be logically coherent.

Terry Eagleton outlines (more or less in no particular order) some definitions of ideology:
 The process of production of meanings, signs and values in social life
 A body of ideas characteristic of a particular social group or class
 Ideas that help legitimate a dominant political power
 False ideas that help legitimate a dominant political power
 Systematically distorted communication
 Ideas that offer a position for a subject
 Forms of thought motivated by social interests
 Identity thinking
 Socially necessary illusion
 The conjuncture of discourse and power
 The medium in which conscious social actors make sense of their world
 Action-oriented sets of beliefs
 The confusion of linguistic and phenomenal reality
 Semiotic closure
 The indispensable medium in which individuals live out their relations to a social structure
 The process that converts social life to a natural reality

German philosopher Christian Duncker called for a "critical reflection of the ideology concept." In his work, he strove to bring the concept of ideology into the foreground, as well as the closely connected concerns of epistemology and history, defining ideology in terms of a system of presentations that explicitly or implicitly claim to absolute truth.

Marxist interpretation

Marx's analysis sees ideology as a system of falsehoods deliberately promulgated by the ruling class as a means of self-perpetuation.

In the Marxist base and superstructure model of society, base denotes the relations of production and modes of production, and superstructure denotes the dominant ideology (i.e. religious, legal, political systems). The economic base of production determines the political superstructure of a society. Ruling class-interests determine the superstructure and the nature of the justifying ideology—actions feasible because the ruling class control the means of production. For example, in a feudal mode of production, religious ideology is the most prominent aspect of the superstructure, while in capitalist formations, ideologies such as liberalism and social democracy dominate. Hence the great importance of ideology justifies a society and politically confuses the alienated groups of society via false consciousness.

Some explanations have been presented. Antonio Gramsci uses cultural hegemony to explain why the working-class have a false ideological conception of what their best interests are. Marx argued that "The class which has the means of material production at its disposal has control at the same time over the means of mental production."

The Marxist formulation of "ideology as an instrument of social reproduction" is conceptually important to the sociology of knowledge, viz. Karl Mannheim, Daniel Bell, and Jürgen Habermas et al. Moreover, Mannheim has developed, and progressed, from the "total" but "special" Marxist conception of ideology to a "general" and "total" ideological conception acknowledging that all ideology (including Marxism) resulted from social life, an idea developed by the sociologist Pierre Bourdieu. Slavoj Žižek and the earlier Frankfurt School added to the "general theory" of ideology a psychoanalytic insight that ideologies do not include only conscious, but also unconscious ideas.

Ideological state apparatuses (Althusser) 
French Marxist philosopher Louis Althusser proposed that ideology is "the imagined existence (or idea) of things as it relates to the real conditions of existence" and makes use of a lacunar discourse. A number of propositions, which are never untrue, suggest a number of other propositions, which are. In this way, the essence of the lacunar discourse is what is not told (but is suggested).

For example, the statement "All are equal before the law," which is a theoretical groundwork of current legal systems, suggests that all people may be of equal worth or have equal opportunities. This is not true, for the concept of private property and power over the means of production results in some people being able to own more (much more) than others. This power disparity contradicts the claim that all share both practical worth and future opportunity equally; for example, the rich can afford better legal representation, which practically privileges them before the law.

Althusser also proffered the concept of the ideological state apparatus to explain his theory of ideology. His first thesis was "ideology has no history": while individual ideologies have histories, interleaved with the general class struggle of society, the general form of ideology is external to history.

For Althusser, beliefs and ideas are the products of social practices, not the reverse. His thesis that "ideas are material" is illustrated by the "scandalous advice" of Pascal toward unbelievers: "Kneel and pray, and then you will believe." What is ultimately ideological for Althusser are not the subjective beliefs held in the conscious "minds" of human individuals, but rather discourses that produce these beliefs, the material institutions and rituals that individuals take part in without submitting it to conscious examination and so much more critical thinking.

Ideology and the Commodity (Debord) 
The French Marxist theorist Guy Debord, founding member of the Situationist International, argued that when the commodity becomes the "essential category" of society, i.e. when the process of commodification has been consummated to its fullest extent, the image of society propagated by the commodity (as it describes all of life as constituted by notions and objects deriving their value only as commodities tradeable in terms of exchange value), colonizes all of life and reduces society to a mere representation, The Society of the Spectacle.

Unifying agents (Hoffer) 
The American philosopher Eric Hoffer identified several elements that unify followers of a particular ideology:

 Hatred: "Mass movements can rise and spread without a God, but never without belief in a devil." The "ideal devil" is a foreigner.
 Imitation: "The less satisfaction we derive from being ourselves, the greater is our desire to be like others…the more we mistrust our judgment and luck, the more are we ready to follow the example of others."
 Persuasion: The proselytizing zeal of propagandists derives from "a passionate search for something not yet found more than a desire to bestow something we already have."
 Coercion: Hoffer asserts that violence and fanaticism are interdependent. People forcibly converted to Islamic or communist beliefs become as fanatical as those who did the forcing. "It takes fanatical faith to rationalize our cowardice."
 Leadership: Without the leader, there is no movement. Often the leader must wait long in the wings until the time is ripe. He calls for sacrifices in the present, to justify his vision of a breathtaking future. The skills required include: audacity, brazenness, iron will, fanatical conviction; passionate hatred, cunning, a delight in symbols; ability to inspire blind faith in the masses; and a group of able lieutenants. Charlatanism is indispensable, and the leader often imitates both friend and foe, "a single-minded fashioning after a model." He will not lead followers towards the "promised land," but only "away from their unwanted selves."
 Action: Original thoughts are suppressed, and unity encouraged, if the masses are kept occupied through great projects, marches, exploration and industry.
 Suspicion: "There is prying and spying, tense watching and a tense awareness of being watched." This pathological mistrust goes unchallenged and encourages conformity, not dissent.

Ronald Inglehart

Ronald Inglehart of the University of Michigan is author of the World Values Survey, which, since 1980, has mapped social attitudes in 100 countries representing 90% of global population. Results indicate that where people live is likely to closely correlate with their ideological beliefs. In much of Africa, South Asia and the Middle East, people prefer traditional beliefs and are less tolerant of liberal values. Protestant Europe, at the other extreme, adheres more to secular beliefs and liberal values. Alone among high-income countries, the United States is exceptional in its adherence to traditional beliefs, in this case Christianity.

Political ideologies

In social studies, a political ideology is a certain ethical set of ideals, principles, doctrines, myths, or symbols of a social movement, institution, class, or large group that explains how society should work, offering some political and cultural blueprint for a certain social order. Political ideologies are concerned with many different aspects of a society, including (for example): the economy, education, health care, labor law, criminal law, the justice system, the provision of social security and social welfare, trade, the environment, minors, immigration, race, use of the military, patriotism, and established religion.

Political ideologies have two dimensions:
 Goals: how society should work; and
 Methods: the most appropriate ways to achieve the ideal arrangement.

There are many proposed methods for the classification of political ideologies, each of these different methods generate a specific political spectrum. Ideologies also identify themselves by their position on the spectrum (e.g. the left, the center or the right), though precision in this respect can often become controversial. Finally, ideologies can be distinguished from political strategies (e.g., populism) and from single issues that a party may be built around (e.g. legalization of marijuana). Philosopher Michael Oakeshott defines such ideology as "the formalized abridgment of the supposed sub-stratum of the rational truth contained in the tradition." Moreover, Charles Blattberg offers an account that distinguishes political ideologies from political philosophies.

A political ideology largely concerns itself with how to allocate power and to what ends power should be used. Some parties follow a certain ideology very closely, while others may take broad inspiration from a group of related ideologies without specifically embracing any one of them. Each political ideology contains certain ideas on what it considers the best form of government (e.g., democracy, demagogy, theocracy, caliphate etc.), scope of government (e.g. authoritarianism, libertarianism, federalism, etc.) and the best economic system (e.g. capitalism, socialism, etc.). Sometimes the same word is used to identify both an ideology and one of its main ideas. For instance, socialism may refer to an economic system, or it may refer to an ideology that supports that economic system.

Post 1991, many commentators claim that we are living in a post-ideological age, in which redemptive, all-encompassing ideologies have failed. This view is often associated with Francis Fukuyama's writings on the end of history. Contrastly, Nienhueser (2011) sees research (in the field of human resource management) as ongoingly "generating ideology."

Slavoj Zizek has pointed out how the very notion of post-ideology can enable the deepest, blindest form of ideology. A sort of false consciousness or false cynicism, engaged in for the purpose of lending one's point of view the respect of being objective, pretending neutral cynicism, without truly being so. Rather than help avoiding ideology, this lapse only deepens the commitment to an existing one. Zizek calls this "a post-modernist trap." Peter Sloterdijk advanced the same idea already in 1988.

Studies have shown that political ideology is somewhat genetically heritable.

Ideocracy

When a political ideology becomes a dominantly pervasive component within a government, one can speak of an ideocracy. Different forms of government use ideology in various ways, not always restricted to politics and society. Certain ideas and schools of thought become favored, or rejected, over others, depending on their compatibility with or use for the reigning social order.

John Maynard Keynes said, "Madmen in authority, who hear voices in the air, are distilling their frenzy from some academic scribbler of a few years back."

In The Anatomy of Revolution, Crane Brinton said that new ideology spreads when there is discontent with an old regime. The may be repeated during revolutions itself; extremists such as Lenin and Robespierre may thus overcome more moderate revolutionaries. This stage is soon followed by Thermidor, a reining back of revolutionary enthusiasm under pragmatists like Stalin and Napoleon Bonaparte, who bring "normalcy and equilibrium." Brinton's sequence ("men of ideas>fanatics>practical men of action") is reiterated by J. William Fulbright, while a similar form occurs in Eric Hoffer's The True Believer. The revolution thus becomes established as an ideocracy, though its rise is likely to be checked by a 'political midlife crisis.'

Epistemological ideologies

Even when the challenging of existing beliefs is encouraged, as in scientific theories, the dominant paradigm or mindset can prevent certain challenges, theories, or experiments from being advanced.

A special case of science that has inspired ideology is ecology, which studies the relationships among living things on Earth. Perceptual psychologist James J. Gibson believed that human perception of ecological relationships was the basis of self-awareness and cognition itself. Linguist George Lakoff has proposed a cognitive science of mathematics wherein even the most fundamental ideas of arithmetic would be seen as consequences or products of human perception—which is itself necessarily evolved within an ecology.

Deep ecology and the modern ecology movement (and, to a lesser degree, Green parties) appear to have adopted ecological sciences as a positive ideology.

Some notable economically based ideologies include neoliberalism, monetarism, mercantilism, mixed economy, social Darwinism, communism, laissez-faire economics, and free trade. There are also current theories of safe trade and fair trade that can be seen as ideologies.

Ideology and the social sciences

Psychological research
A large amount of research in psychology is concerned with the causes, consequences and content of ideology. According to system justification theory, ideologies reflect (unconscious) motivational processes, as opposed to the view that political convictions always reflect independent and unbiased thinking. Jost, Ledgerwood and Hardin (2008) propose that ideologies may function as prepackaged units of interpretation that spread because of basic human motives to understand the world, avoid existential threat, and maintain valued interpersonal relationships. The authors conclude that such motives may lead disproportionately to the adoption of system-justifying worldviews. Psychologists generally agree that personality traits, individual difference variables, needs, and ideological beliefs seem to have something in common.

Semiotic theory
According to semiotician Bob Hodge:[Ideology] identifies a unitary object that incorporates complex sets of meanings with the social agents and processes that produced them. No other term captures this object as well as 'ideology'. Foucault's 'episteme' is too narrow and abstract, not social enough. His 'discourse', popular because it covers some of ideology's terrain with less baggage, is too confined to verbal systems. 'Worldview' is too metaphysical, 'propaganda' too loaded. Despite or because of its contradictions, 'ideology' still plays a key role in semiotics oriented to social, political life.Authors such as Michael Freeden have also recently incorporated a semantic analysis to the study of ideologies.

Sociology 
Sociologists define ideology as "cultural beliefs that justify particular social arrangements, including patterns of inequality." Dominant groups use these sets of cultural beliefs and practices to justify the systems of inequality that maintain their group's social power over non-dominant groups. Ideologies use a society's symbol system to organize social relations in a hierarchy, with some social identities being superior to other social identities, which are considered inferior. The dominant ideology in a society is passed along through the society's major social institutions, such as the media, the family, education, and religion. As societies changed throughout history, so did the ideologies that justified systems of inequality.

Sociological examples of ideologies include: racism; sexism; heterosexism; ableism; and ethnocentrism.

Quotations
 "We do not need…to believe in an ideology. All that is necessary is for each of us to develop our good human qualities. The need for a sense of universal responsibility affects every aspect of modern life." — Dalai Lama.
 "The function of ideology is to stabilize and perpetuate dominance through masking or illusion." — Sally Haslanger
 "[A]n ideology differs from a simple opinion in that it claims to possess either the key to history, or the solution for all the ‘riddles of the universe,’ or the intimate knowledge of the hidden universal laws, which are supposed to rule nature and man." — Hannah Arendt

See also

 The Anatomy of Revolution
 Capitalism
 Feminism
 Hegemony
 -ism
 List of communist ideologies
 List of ideologies named after people
 Ideocracy
 Noble lie
 Politicisation
 Social criticism
 Socially constructed reality
 State collapse
 State ideology of the Soviet Union
 The True Believer
 World Values Survey
 World view

References

Bibliography
 Althusser, Louis. [1970] 1971. "Ideology and Ideological State Apparatuses." In Lenin and Philosophy and Other Essays. Monthly Review Press .
 Belloni, Claudio. 2013. Per la critica dell’ideologia: Filosofia e storia in Marx. Milan: Mimesis.
 Debord, Guy. 1967 The Society of the Spectacle. BUREAU OF PUBLIC SECRETS 2014 (Annotated Edition)
 Duncker, Christian 2006. Kritische Reflexionen Des Ideologiebegriffes. .
 —, ed. 2008. "Ideologiekritik Aktuell." Ideologies Today 1. London. .
 Eagleton, Terry. 1991. Ideology: An Introduction. Verso. .
 Ellul, Jacques. [1965] 1973. Propaganda: The Formation of Men's Attitudes, translated by K. Kellen and J. Lerner. New York: Random House.
 Freeden, Michael. 1996. Ideologies and Political Theory: A Conceptual Approach. Oxford: Oxford University Press. 
 Feuer, Lewis S. 2010. Ideology and Ideologists. Piscataway, NJ: Transaction Publishers.
 Gries, Peter Hays. 2014. The Politics of American Foreign Policy: How Ideology Divides Liberals and Conservatives over Foreign Affairs. Stanford: Stanford University Press.
 Haas, Mark L. 2005. The Ideological Origins of Great Power Politics, 1789–1989. Cornell University Press. .
 Hawkes, David. 2003. Ideology (2nd ed.). Routledge. .
 James, Paul, and Manfred Steger. 2010. Globalization and Culture, Vol. 4: Ideologies of Globalism. London: SAGE Publications.
 Lukács, Georg. [1967] 1919–1923. History and Class Consciousness, translated by R. Livingstone. Merlin Press.
 Malesevic, Sinisa, and Iain Mackenzie, eds. Ideology after Poststructuralism. London: Pluto Press.
 Mannheim, Karl. 1936. Ideology and Utopia. Routledge.
 Marx, Karl. [1845–46] 1932. The German Ideology.
 Minogue, Kenneth. 1985. Alien Powers: The Pure Theory of Ideology. Palgrave Macmillan. .
 Minar, David W. 1961. "Ideology and Political Behavior." Midwest Journal of Political Science 5(4):317–31. . .
 Mullins, Willard A. 1972.:)) "On the Concept of Ideology in Political Science." American Political Science Review 66(2):498–510. .
 Owen, John. 2011. The Clash of Ideas in World Politics: Transnational Networks, States, and Regime Change, 1510-2010. Princeton University Press. .
 Pinker, Steven. 2002. The Blank Slate: The Modern Denial of Human Nature. New York: Penguin Group. .
 Sorce Keller, Marcello. 2007. "Why is Music so Ideological, Why Do Totalitarian States Take It So Seriously: A Personal View from History, and the Social Sciences." Journal of Musicological Research 26(2–3):91–122.
 Steger, Manfred B., and Paul James. 2013. "Levels of Subjective Globalization: Ideologies, Imaginaries, Ontologies." Perspectives on Global Development and Technology 12(1–2):17–40. 
 Verschueren, Jef. 2012. Ideology in Language Use: Pragmatic Guidelines for Empirical Research. Cambridge University Press. 
 Zizek, Slavoj. 1989. The Sublime Object of Ideology. Verso. .

External links

 The Pervert's Guide to Ideology: How Ideology Seduces Us—and How We Can (Try to) Escape It
 Ideology Study Guide
 Louis Althusser's "Ideology and Ideological State Apparatuses"

 
1790s neologisms
Critical theory
Political terminology
Philosophical theories
Schools of thought
Sociological terminology